Marie-Christine Tschopp (born 25 January 1951) is a French football player who played as midfielder for French club  Stade de Reims of the Division 1 Féminine.

References

1951 births
Stade de Reims Féminines players
French women's footballers
France women's international footballers
Division 1 Féminine players
Women's association football midfielders
Living people